Manara Shiswa (Nepali: मनरा शिसवा ) is a municipality in Mahottari District in Province No. 2 of Nepal. It was formed in 2016 occupying current 10 sections (wards) from previous 10 former VDCs. It occupies an area of 49.73 km2 with a total population of 49,692.

References 

Populated places in Mahottari District
Nepal municipalities established in 2017
Municipalities in Madhesh Province